O. V. Usha (born 4 November 1948) is a Malayalam poet and novelist. Described by K. M. George as a poet with "deep moral concern and technical dexterity", she has written four volumes of poems and a few short stories while also authoring a novel. She has also written articles in various journals. Usha served the Mahatma Gandhi University Kottayam as its director of publications. She won the Kerala State Film Award for Best Lyrics for Mazha, a Malayalam film released in 2000.

Biography

Usha was born in a small village near Palakkad, Kerala as the youngest child of her family. Her childhood was mostly spent in her native village. Her father was employed at "Malabar Special Police" while her eldest brother O. V. Vijayan was a novelist and cartoonist. Usha was drawn to Malayalam literature by her mother thus developing an interest towards it at an early age. Usha started writing poems at the age of 13, and was a frequent contributor to the "Children's Corner" of the Malayalam weekly Mathrubhumi. Her poems were published regularly in the weekly till 1973 when she was aged 25. After her schooling, she moved to Delhi, as her brother was settled there, and completed a post graduate degree in English literature from the Delhi University. Upon completing her degree, Usha started her career as an editorial trainee and later became the editor-in-chief of a publishing house. In 1971, one of her short stories titled "Inquilab Zindabad" was made into a film of the same name. In the same film she wrote a song ( 'aarude manasile gaanamayi njan', music G. Devarajan, Singer P.Leela) presumably by first women lyricist in modern Malayalam filmdom. From 1973, she did not contribute more for a period of ten years. In 1982, she resumed writing and has been a frequent contributor since then. While most of her poems are not published in a "book form", her only novel Shahid Naama was published in 2001. She was one among the jury members of the Kerala State Film Awards in 2008 and served the Mahatma Gandhi University, Kottayam as its director of publications.

Works
 Snehageethangal (Poetry)
 Dhyaanam (Poetry)
 Agnimitrannoru Kurippu (Poetry)
 Shahid Naama (Novel, 2001)
 Nilam Thodaa Mannu (Short story)

Awards
 2000 – Kerala State Film Award for Best Lyrics for Mazha

Notes

References

Sources

External links

1948 births
Living people
Novelists from Kerala
Malayalam-language lyricists
Malayalam poets
Delhi University alumni
Kerala State Film Award winners
Articles created or expanded during Women's History Month (India) - 2014
Government Victoria College, Palakkad alumni
Indian lyricists
20th-century Indian poets
21st-century Indian poets
21st-century Indian short story writers
21st-century Indian novelists
Indian women poets
Indian women short story writers
Indian women novelists
People from Palakkad district
20th-century Indian women writers
21st-century Indian women writers
21st-century Indian writers
Women writers from Kerala
Poets from Kerala